The Antonov T-2M Maverick is a Ukrainian ultralight trike, designed and produced by Antonov.

Design and development
The T-2M was developed by the Antonov Design Bureau at the end of the Cold War when it became necessary to explore civil markets for aircraft, including microlights for club flying. Aside from production for recreational purposes, the T-2M was also designed for use by the Russian Special Forces for use on infiltration missions, and as such incorporated a sophisticated wing folding mechanism at their request.

The T-2M features a cable-braced hang glider-style high-wing, weight-shift controls, a two-seats-in-side-by-side configuration open cockpit, tricycle landing gear and a single engine in pusher configuration. The aircraft is made from tubing, with its wing covered in Dacron sailcloth. Its  area wing is supported by a single tube-type kingpost and uses an "A" frame control bar. The standard engine supplied was the  Rotax 582 twin-cylinder, two-stroke, liquid-cooled powerplant. The smaller  Rotax 503 and the four-stroke  Rotax 912 were also supplied.

The T-2M introduced two features not found on western trikes. It has side-by-side seating, which offers advantages in flight training and also has a large single piece leaf spring main landing gear, which is simple, light, low drag and eliminates many of the large number of parts that other designs use. The aircraft can be operated on wheels, skis and floats. An agricultural aircraft aerial application package is also available.

The T-2M was sold in North America and a dealer, UK-Air, was based in Mississauga, Ontario, Canada. It sold for US$18,500 in 2000.

Specifications (T-2M)

References

1990s Ukrainian ultralight aircraft
Single-engined pusher aircraft
Ultralight trikes